Bill Nguyen (born 1971) is a Vietnamese-American technology entrepreneur.

Life
Nguyen grew up in Houston, the son of Vietnamese immigrants.
He attended Strake Jesuit College Preparatory, graduating in 1991, then attended Houston Baptist University.

Nguyen headed business development and product management at the ForeFront Group, which was founded in 1992 and had their initial public offering in 1995.
He served as vice president of products of FreeLoader which was founded in 1995 and sold in 1996.

Nguyen founded Onebox.com in 1999. It was acquired for $850 million in 1999 by Phone.com (later part of Openwave). 
He sold his stake quickly and started SEVEN Networks, a wireless e-mail firm that claimed 1.4 billion accounts. 
Nguyen founded Seven Networks in May 2000 and served as its co-chief executive officer until April 2005.
In 2002, Nguyen was named to the MIT Technology Review TR100 as one of the top 100 innovators in the world under the age of 35.

Nguyen then co-founded La La Media Inc. in 2005 in Palo Alto, California. 
In 2006 Newsweek and Wired described the company as a mix of MySpace, Netflix, Napster  and iTunes. 
The company bought and sold compact discs. Eventually, La La developed one of the first, free streaming music services. On December 5, 2009, Lala.com was acquired by Apple Inc. for $80 million. 
Apple announced that lala.com service was shut down on May 31, 2010.
He was on the World Economic Forum's Young Global Leaders list in 2010.

Nguyen was a co-founder of Color labs, Inc. in 2010 and served as its chief executive officer, but had been away from day-to-day operations since July 2012.
Apple acquired Color labs for their engineering team and the Color service was closed in 2013.

Further reading
  (In Vietnamese)

References 

1971 births
Living people
Strake Jesuit College Preparatory alumni
People from Houston
American Internet celebrities
American technology company founders
American people of Vietnamese descent